"Mozart's House" is a song by the English electronic music group Clean Bandit. It was released on 29 March 2013 as the second single from their first studio album, New Eyes (2014). The song peaked at number 17 on the UK Singles Chart. It includes part of the String Quartet No. 21 by Wolfgang Amadeus Mozart.

Music video
A music video to accompany the release of "Mozart's House" was first released onto YouTube on 15 October 2010 at a total length of four minutes and four seconds. It has clips of the vocalist Ssegawa Ssekintu singing in various locations, along with a clip of the cellist Grace Chatto in her underwear, holding a violin across her chest. Chatto held a position teaching cello at a school when the release took place, and her appearance half naked caused her to be fired, following the complaint by a parent signaling this was indecent.

The video was filmed predominantly in Moscow, Russia, with some scenes filmed in London near Docklands Light Railway stations. Long sections of the video were filmed in slow motion then sped up to synchronise with normal speed.

Track listing

Charts

Release history

References

2013 singles
Clean Bandit songs
2013 songs
Warner Music Group singles
Songs written by Jack Patterson (Clean Bandit)
Songs written by Grace Chatto